Abdelkarim El Haouari (born 19 December 1993) is a Moroccan fencer. At the 2012 Summer Olympics he competed in the Men's épée, but was defeated in the first round.

References

Moroccan male épée fencers
Living people
Olympic fencers of Morocco
Fencers at the 2012 Summer Olympics
1993 births
Competitors at the 2022 Mediterranean Games
Mediterranean Games competitors for Morocco